Phil Krueger (October 6, 1929 – June 22, 2020) was an American football player, coach, and executive. He served as the head football coach Fresno State University from 1964 to 1965 and at Utah State University from 1973 to 1975, compiling a career college football coaching record of 31–22.

Krueger quit the Fresno State head coaching job to join the staff of John McKay at the University of Southern California (USC) and was an assistant on the 1967 USC Trojans team that won a national championship. After leaving the Utah State job, he again worked for McKay on the staff of the National Football League's expansion Tampa Bay Buccaneers, from 1976 to 1980. He was the offensive backs coach in 1976, the linebackers coach in 1977 and coached the special teams from 1978 to 1980. He continued to work for the Tampa Bay Buccaneers front office in the 1980s, rising to general manager in 1986.

Playing career and education
Krueger played college football as a quarterback at Southeast Missouri State College. He graduated from Southeast Missouri State in 1951 with a bachelor's degree in English. Krueger earned a master's degree in physical education from the University of Missouri in 1956.

Head coaching record

References

1929 births
2020 deaths
American football quarterbacks
Fresno State Bulldogs football coaches
Illinois Fighting Illini football coaches
Southeast Missouri State Redhawks football players
Tampa Bay Buccaneers coaches
Tampa Bay Buccaneers executives
USC Trojans football coaches
Utah State Aggies football coaches
Junior college football coaches in the United States
University of Missouri alumni
People from LaSalle, Illinois
Coaches of American football from Illinois
Players of American football from Illinois